Duclaux may refer to:

People
 Agnes Mary Frances Duclaux (1857–1944), English writer and Francophile scholar
 Émile Duclaux (1840–1904), French microbiologist and chemist
 Jacques Duclaux (1877–1978), French biologist and chemist

Places
 Duclaux Point, a location in the Antarctic